Kang Soo-yun (born 15 March 1976) is a female golfer in the LPGA.  She is often referred to as the "Fashion Model of the Fairways" for her model-like physique and clothing.

Kang was born in Seoul, South Korea. She has been playing golf since the age of 12.  After years on the LPGA of Korea Tour, she moved to the LPGA Tour in 2003.  She won her first LPGA tournament in 2005 at the Safeway Classic in Portland, Oregon. She has twelve other wins worldwide.

Professional wins
this list is incomplete

LPGA Tour (1)

LPGA Tour of Korea (8)
this list is probably incomplete
2000 Korea Women's Open, Hite Ladies Open
2001 Korea Women's Open, Hite Ladies Open, LG Lady Card Open
2002 Sky Valley Kim Young-Joo Invitational, Hite Ladies Open
2004 PAVV Invitational

LPGA Tour of Japan (3)

Team appearances
Amateur
Espirito Santo Trophy (representing South Korea): 1996 (winners)

References

External links 

Soo Yun Kang at SeoulSisters.com

South Korean female golfers
LPGA Tour golfers
LPGA of Korea Tour golfers
LPGA of Japan Tour golfers
Asian Games medalists in golf
Asian Games silver medalists for South Korea
Golfers at the 1994 Asian Games
Medalists at the 1994 Asian Games
Golfers from Seoul
1976 births
Living people